Rodrigo Oliveira da Silva Alvim (born 23 November 1983) is a former Brazilian professional footballer who played as a left back.

Career
Born in Porto Alegre, Alvim made his professional debuts in 2003 with Sociedade Esportiva e Recreativa Caxias do Sul. He went on to represent Grêmio Foot-Ball Porto Alegrense and Paraná Clube in his country and, in July 2006, he moved to Portuguese club C.F. Os Belenenses.

After two impressive Primeira Liga seasons with the Lisbon team, Alvim signed a three-year deal with Bundesliga side VfL Wolfsburg, in late July 2008. He was crowned league champion in his first season, but contributed with only 24 minutes of action to that feat.

On 25 January 2010, Alvim's contract with Wolfsburg was terminated and, on the following day, he returned to his country and joined defending champions Clube de Regatas do Flamengo.

Career Statistics

according to combined sources on the Flamengo official website and Flaestatística.

Notes

Honours
Wolfsburg
Bundesliga: 2008–09

Flamengo
Campeonato Carioca: 2011

References

External links

 

1983 births
Living people
Footballers from Porto Alegre
Brazilian footballers
Association football defenders
Campeonato Brasileiro Série A players
Campeonato Brasileiro Série B players
Sociedade Esportiva e Recreativa Caxias do Sul players
Grêmio Foot-Ball Porto Alegrense players
Paraná Clube players
CR Flamengo footballers
Joinville Esporte Clube players
Paysandu Sport Club players
Primeira Liga players
C.F. Os Belenenses players
Bundesliga players
VfL Wolfsburg players
Miami Dade FC players
Brazilian expatriate footballers
Expatriate footballers in Portugal
Expatriate footballers in Germany
Expatriate soccer players in the United States
Brazilian expatriate sportspeople in Portugal
Brazilian expatriate sportspeople in Germany